Sven and Erik Nordstrom are two famous Swedish organ builders from the 19th century. Sven Nordstrom (4 February 1801 -  16 February 1887) and his younger brother Erik Nordstrom (28 September 1818 - 26 January 1907) were established starting 1879 in Eksjo.

The value of their work is well recognized as of the 50 organs they built, about half survived in service to this day, and many are still in their original condition.

They were also known  for repairing facades of churches

Organs
Jönköpings frimurarloge, 1834
Bälaryds kyrka, Småland, 1839
Hults kyrka, Småland, 1841
Edshults kyrka, Småland, 1843
Sankt Laurentii kyrka, Söderköping, 1845
Å kyrka, Östergötland, 1846
Tåby kyrka, Östergötland, 1847
Målilla kyrka, Småland, 1850
Västra Eneby kyrka, Östergötland, 1851
Skönberga kyrka, Östergötland, 1852
Ledbergs kyrka, Östergötland, 1852
Normlösa kyrka, Östergötland, 1854
Flisby kyrka, Småland, 1856
Forserums kyrka, Småland, 1856
Nässja kyrka, Östergötland, 1856
Tingstads kyrka, Östergötland, 1862
Nykils kyrka, Östergötland, 1863
Linderås kyrka, Småland, 1864
Östra Ny kyrka, Östergötland, 1865
Hägerstads kyrka, Östergötland, 1866
Sjögestads kyrka, Östergötland, 1870
Barkeryds kyrka, Småland, 1873* 
Norrköpings fängelsekyrka, 1873
Karlstorps kyrka, Småland, 1876
Bankeryds kyrka, Småland, 1879*
Eksjö metodistkyrka, 1880
Kuddby kyrka, Östergötland, 1882
Lekeryds kyrka, Småland, 1888*
Näsby kyrka, Småland, 1893*
(* means just Erik Nordstrom, others joint)

Facades
About the facades they have repaired:
Skede kyrka, Småland, 1835
Rumskulla kyrka, Småland, 1840
Mellby kyrka, Småland, 1844
Björkö kyrka, Småland 1848
Linköpings högre allm. läroverk, 1849
Värna kyrka, Östergötland, 1850
Liareds kyrka, Västergötland, 1855
Bankekinds kyrka, Östergötland, 1857
Marbäcks kyrka, Småland, 1858
Frinnaryds kyrka, Småland, 1858
Mjölby kyrka, 1859*
Östra Stenby kyrka, Östergötland, 1860
Järstorps kyrka, Småland, 1864*
Bredestads kyrka, Småland, 1866*
Eksjo kyrka, 1867
Lönneberga kyrka, Småland, 1874*
Torpa kyrka, Östergötland, 1875*
Hässleby kyrka, Småland, 1878
Asby kyrka, Östergötland, 1887*  
(* means just Erik Nordstrom, others joint)

Notes
Erici, Einar (1965). Inventarium över bevarade äldre kyrkorglar i Sverige: tillkomna före mitten av 1800-talet några ock mellan åren 1850 och 1865 och ett par ännu senare, men dock stilistiskt sammanhörande med de äldre. Stockholm: Kyrkomusikernas riksförbund. Libris
Carl-Gustaf Lewenhaupt: Orgelbyggarna Sven & Erik Nordström, Eksjöbygdens orgelgrupp (1993)
Frisk Anna, Jullander Sverker, McCrea Andrew, (2003). The Nordic-Baltic organ book: history and culture. GOArt publications, Göteborg Organ Art Center, Univ.

Swedish pipe organ builders
1801 births
1818 births
1887 deaths
1907 deaths